Rahmat Sukra Sofiadi (born 15 November 1965) is a Bulgarian former wrestler who competed in the 1988 Summer Olympics and in the 1992 Summer Olympics. Sofiadi's mother is Bulgarian while his father is Indonesian.

References

1965 births
Living people
Olympic wrestlers of Bulgaria
Wrestlers at the 1988 Summer Olympics
Wrestlers at the 1992 Summer Olympics
Bulgarian male sport wrestlers
Olympic bronze medalists for Bulgaria
Olympic medalists in wrestling
Medalists at the 1988 Summer Olympics
20th-century Bulgarian people
21st-century Bulgarian people